Old Al Hitmi (also known as Al-Hitmi Al-Ateeq or simply Al Hitmi) is a mixed-use district in Qatar, located in the municipality of Ad Dawhah. The name is derived from Al-Hitmi family, which is a branch of the main Al Bin Ali tribe. Together with Al Rufaa, it forms Zone 17, which has a population of 6,028.

History
The district was first settled around 1930 by the Al Hitmi family, a branch of the Al Bin Ali tribe. Most residential units here date back to the early-to-mid 20th century. As a result of many years of neglect, most of the older buildings have fallen into varying states of disrepair. After Qatar began profiting from oil extraction in the 1970s and 1980s, many modernistic high-rise buildings were constructed. Currently, the neighborhood suffers from cluttered roads and a shortage of sidewalks, pedestrian crossings and parking spaces.

Gallery

See also
New Al Hitmi

References

Communities in Doha